Johan Bara or Johannes Barra (1581–1634) was a Dutch painter, designer and engraver.

Life
Barra was probably born in 's-Hertogenbosch or Middelburg. He was active in Augsburg and Neurenberg in 1599, in Middelburg in 1604, in London between 1624 and 1627, in Amsterdam in 1631, and back in London in 1634, where he died.

He called himself, sometimes, "sculptor et vitrearum imaginum pictor", and published, from 1598 to 1632, several engravings which resemble, without equalling, those of Aegidius Sadeler. His first plate, "Susanna in the Bath", signed Barra (1598), is very rare. His plates are numerous.

References

External links
 

1581 births
1634 deaths
Dutch engravers
Dutch Golden Age painters
Dutch male painters